Haidar Abdul-Jabar Kadhim (born August 25, 1976), known as Haidar Jabar, is an Iraqi former football defender who last played for the Al-Zawra'a SC football club.

Honours

Country 
 2002 WAFF Champions
 4th place in 2004 Athens Olympics

External links
 
 

1976 births
Living people
Iraqi footballers
Iraq international footballers
Iraqi expatriate footballers
Footballers at the 2004 Summer Olympics
Olympic footballers of Iraq
1996 AFC Asian Cup players
2004 AFC Asian Cup players
Expatriate footballers in Syria
Al-Zawraa SC players
erbil SC players
Expatriate footballers in Jordan
Al-Ittihad Aleppo players
Expatriate footballers in Lebanon
Al-Wehdat SC players
Association football defenders
Salam Zgharta FC players
Iraqi expatriate sportspeople in Lebanon
Lebanese Premier League players
Syrian Premier League players